Rhopaloiulidae is a family of millipedes belonging to the order Julida.

Genera:
 Cyphopoditius
 Rhopaloiulus Attems, 1926

References

Julida